Leonel Jonás Aguirre Avalo (born 5 March 1992) is a professional Argentine footballer who plays for Atlético de Rafaela.

He was born in Santa Fe and is known for his speed.

References

1992 births
Living people
Argentine expatriate footballers
Argentine footballers
Argentine Primera División players
Primera Nacional players
Liga MX players
Rosario Central footballers
Club Necaxa footballers
Club Puebla players
Club Atlético Belgrano footballers
Club Atlético Mitre footballers
San Martín de San Juan footballers
Atlético de Rafaela footballers
Argentine expatriate sportspeople in Mexico
Expatriate footballers in Mexico
Association football midfielders
People from General López Department
Sportspeople from Santa Fe Province